The 1914 Tennessee Volunteers football team represented the University of Tennessee in the 1914 Southern Intercollegiate Athletic Association football season. The team won the Southern Intercollegiate Athletic Association, the first championship of any kind for the Tennessee program.  Winning all nine of their games, the 1914 squad was only the second undefeated team in Tennessee history.  The 1914 Vols were retroactively awarded a national championship by 1st-N-Goal, though this remains largely unrecognized.

Before the season
In 1913, the Volunteers had a winning record for the first time since 1908 and won their first Southern Intercollegiate Athletic Association game since 1910. The team lost captain Sam Hayley.

Miller Pontius assisted coach Clevenger.

Schedule

Season summary

Carson-Newman
To open the season, Carson-Newman was swamped 89–0.

King
King College was defeated almost as easily as Carson-Newman, 55–3.

Clemson
The Volunteers beat Clemson 27–0. Tennessee scored twice on forward passes, and Clemson tried several passes but none were successful. The starting lineup was Carroll (left end), G. Vowell (left tackle), Taylor (left guard), McLean (center), Kerr (right guard), Kelly (right tackle), Greenwood (right end), May (quarterback), Thomason (left halfback), Rainey (right halfback), Lindsay (fullback).

Louisville
Tennessee's backfield starred in the 66–0 defeat of Louisville. The starting lineup was Carroll (left end), G. Vowell (left tackle), Kerr (left guard), McLean (center), Taylor (right guard), Kelly (right tackle), Sorrells (right end), May (quarterback), Thomason (left halfback), Rainey (right halfback), Lindsay (fullback).

Alabama
Alabama quarterback Charlie Joplin was ruled ineligible by the SIAA for refusing to sign an affidavit that he had not played professional baseball, and Tennessee halfback Red Rainey was out with injury. Tennessee won 17–7. The first score came on a 40-yard pass from Bill May to Scotty Cameron. A 22-yard pass to Goat Carroll got the next score.  Alabama's score came in the second period, when Bully Van de Graaff picked up a Farmer Kelly fumble and ran 50 yards for a touchdown. Cameron kicked a field goal to make it 17.

The starting lineup was Carroll (left end), Bayer (left tackle), Kerr (left guard), McLean (center), Taylor (right guard), Kelly (right tackle), G. Vowell (right end), May (quarterback), Thomason (left halfback), Cameron (right halfback), Lindsay (fullback).

Chattanooga
The Vols beat Chattanooga 67–0.

Vanderbilt
Bill May threw two touchdown passes to Goat Carroll in the 16–14 victory over Vanderbilt, the first ever victory over the Tennessee rival. Carroll scored all of the Vols points, adding a field goal in between touchdowns. Irby Curry scored all of Vanderbilt's points. An account of the first Tennessee touchdown reads, "Four minutes of play had barely drifted by when Tennessee's weird, mystic, elusive forward pass, May to Carroll, deadly in accuracy, went sailing home for the first touchdown of the game. The chesty Tennessee quarterback sent the oval whizzing for a distance of thirty-five yards and Carroll gathered in the ball near his goal line, when he hurried beneath the posts with all the speed at his command."

Sewanee
A description of the 14–7 win over Sewanee in Chattanooga read, "Mush Kerr played a wonderful game in the line as did Capt. Kelly. The work of the Tennessee line was easily the feature of the contest, and Sewanee early discovered that it was practically useless to rely on line plunges to gain ground...Lindsay, as usual, ploughed through the opposing line for consistent gains, and when it was absolutely necessary that Tennessee gain a certain number of yards 'Russ' was sure to be called upon." Lee Tolley starred for Sewanee, which had been coached to break-up the forward pass.

Kentucky
The Kentucky Wildcats were outweighed 15 pounds to the man and beaten 23–6. Graham Vowell scored three touchdowns.

The starting lineup was Carroll (left end), Bayer (left tackle), Kerr (left guard), McLean (center), Taylor (right guard), Kelly (right tackle), G. Vowell (right end), May (quarterback), Thomason (left halfback), Rainey (right halfback), Lindsay (fullback).

Personnel

Depth chart
The following chart provides a visual depiction of Tennessee's lineup during the 1914 season with games started at the position reflected in parenthesis. The chart mimics a T Formation.

Roster

Line

Backfield

Unlisted

Postseason

Championships
The Birmingham Newspaper Club awarded Tennessee the Southern championship cup.

Awards and honors
Alonzo Carroll, Farmer Kelly, Mush Kerr, and Rus Lindsay made All-Southern.

References

Additional sources
 

Tennessee
Tennessee Volunteers football seasons
College football undefeated seasons
Tennessee Volunteers football